Amyand's hernia is a rare form of an inguinal hernia (less than 1% of inguinal hernias) which occurs when the appendix is included in the hernial sac and becomes incarcerated. The condition is an eponymous disease named after a French surgeon, Claudius Amyand (1660–1740), who performed the first successful appendectomy in 1735.

Most of the cases are diagnosed intraoperatively and a preoperative diagnosis is rarely made in such cases. Management should be individualized according to appendix's inflammation stage, presence of abdominal sepsis, and comorbidity factors. The decision should be based on factors such as the patient's age, the size and anatomy of the appendix, and in case of appendicitis, standard appendectomy and herniorrhaphy without a mesh should be the standard of care.

Amyand's hernia is commonly misdiagnosed as an ordinary incarcerated hernia. Symptoms mimicking appendicitis may occur. Treatment consists of a combination of appendectomy and hernia repair. The inflammatory status of the appendix determines the type of hernia repair and the surgical approach. Incidental appendicectomy in the case of a normal appendix is not favoured.

See also
Littré's hernia
De Garengeot's hernia

References

Inguinal hernias